The 2011–12 Phoenix Suns season was the 44th season of the franchise in the National Basketball Association (NBA), as well as the last season the Suns had point guard Steve Nash on the team. The season was shortened to sixty-six games due to the 2011 NBA Lockout. Going into the All-Star break with a 14–20 record, the Suns went 14–6 in their next 20 games to push back into playoffs contention. Towards the end of the season, the eighth-seeded Suns were still in the hunt, but a loss after their second-to-last game on the road against the Utah Jazz eliminated them from playoff contention. They went 8–7 in April, finishing the season with a 33–33 record, 10th-best in the West.

Nash led the team in assists per game (10.7; second-best average in the league, most assists in total), three-point percentage (.390%), and free throw percentage (.894%), while averaging a career-high in field goal percentage (.532%). Center Marcin Gortat led the team in most statistical categories, including games played (66), games started (66), minutes per game (32.0), field goal percentage (.555%), rebounds per game (10.0), blocks per game (1.5), and points per game (15.4). Nash was the lone member of the Suns selected for the 2012 NBA All-Star Game, his eighth appearance. In a game against the Denver Nuggets on April 21, Nash passed Oscar Robertson for fifth all-time in total assists.

Key dates
June 23, 2011: The 2011 NBA draft took place at the Prudential Center in Newark, New Jersey.
July 1, 2011: The current NBA collective bargaining agreement expires, leading owners to impose a lockout of its players until a new agreement is reached.
November 22, 2011: Aaron Brooks signs with the Guangdong Southern Tigers in the CBA. As a result, he can't reunite with the team until the 2011–12 CBA season is officially over.
December 9, 2011: The new and improved NBA free agency begun; Grant Hill stays with Phoenix; Shannon Brown and Sebastian Telfair join Phoenix; Mickaël Piétrus tried to get traded to the Toronto Raptors; Vince Carter and Gani Lawal are waived.
December 10, 2011: The Mickaël Piétrus trade is permanently suspended; training camp begins.
December 13, 2011: Zabian Dowdell is waived and replaced with Ronnie Price.
December 18, 2011: Training camp ends.
December 22, 2011: Mickaël Piétrus is waived.
December 26, 2011: The NBA season begins for Phoenix.
December 29, 2011: Michael Redd signs with Phoenix.
January 2, 2012: Garret Siler is waived.
February 8, 2012: Markieff Morris gets represented as a rookie for the 2012 Rising Stars challenge.
February 9, 2012: Steve Nash gets his 8th All-Star representation; 6th as a reserve and 6th as a representative of the Phoenix Suns (which ties a record previously set by Walter Davis).
February 24, 2012: The 2012 NBA All-Star Weekend begins.
April 18, 2012: The Suns officially induct former head coach John MacLeod in the Phoenix Suns Ring of Honor.

Offseason

NBA Draft

The Suns used their only draft pick to select power forward Markieff Morris from Kansas. Morris averaged 13.6 points and 8.3 rebounds per game in his last year with the Jayhawks. The Suns traded their other first-round pick, which they acquired from the Orlando Magic, to the Houston Rockets when they dealt Goran Dragić for Aaron Brooks. Their second-round pick was traded to the Chicago Bulls for Hakim Warrick in a sign and trade. Around a year and a half later, the Suns ended up with the 14th draft pick in Marcus Morris, who would be a part of the team for two or so seasons before being traded himself in 2015.

Free agency
Veteran forward Grant Hill became an unrestricted free agent at the end of the 2010–11 season. Newly acquired point guard Aaron Brooks became a restricted free agent at the end of the season. On June 23, the Suns extended a $3 million qualifying offer to Brooks. However, due to the lockout, Brooks signed a contract with the Guangdong Southern Tigers of the Chinese Basketball Association on November 22. With no opt-out clause, Brooks had to complete the CBA season before returning to the NBA. On February 6, 2011, reserve point guard Zabian Dowdell was signed for the remainder of the 2010–11 season, with a team option for a second year.

Coaching changes
On July 14, the Suns signed Elston Turner as an assistant coach. Turner is considered to be a defensive specialist and has been called the Suns' unofficial "defensive coordinator".

Roster

Salaries
The final year of Vince Carter's contract was non-guaranteed. Carter's contract stipulated that if he was not waived by the Suns before the start of free agency on July 1, his $18 million would become fully guaranteed. However, with the onset of the lockout, the Suns delayed the deadline until the date on which free agency began at the end of the lockout. Since he was waived by the time the lockout ended and the free agency period officially began that season, he would receive a guaranteed $4 million outside of the team instead. The second-year contracts of Gani Lawal and Garret Siler were non-guaranteed.

Preseason

|- bgcolor="ffcccc"
| 1
| December 20
| @ Denver
| 
| Marcin Gortat,Hakim Warrick (14)
| Marcin Gortat,Markieff Morris (8)
| Steve Nash,Sebastian Telfair (5)
| Pepsi Center11,475
| 0–1
|- bgcolor="ffcccc"
| 2
| December 22
| Denver
| 
| Jared Dudley (17)
| Markieff Morris (7)
| Steve Nash (8)
| US Airways Center12,613
| 0–2

Regular season

Standings

Record vs. opponents

Game log
All games from November 1 through December 24 were canceled due to the 2011 NBA Lockout. A new schedule was created with games starting on December 25.

|- bgcolor=ffcccc
| 1
| December 26
| New Orleans
| 
| Robin Lopez (21)
| Markieff Morris (9)
| Steve Nash (12)
| US Airways Center17,776
| 0–1
|- bgcolor=ffcccc
| 2
| December 28
| Philadelphia
| 
| Ronnie Price (16)
| Channing Frye,Marcin Gortat (8)
| Ronnie Price (4)
| US Airways Center16,360
| 0–2
|- bgcolor=ccffcc
| 3
| December 30
| @ New Orleans
| 
| Hakim Warrick (18)
| Channing Frye (16)
| Steve Nash (12)
| New Orleans Arena15,790
| 1–2
|- bgcolor=ffcccc
| 4
| December 31
| @ Oklahoma City
| 
| Markieff Morris,Hakim Warrick (15)
| Marcin Gortat,Markieff Morris (6)
| Steve Nash (6)
| Chesapeake Energy Arena18,203
| 1–3

|- bgcolor=ccffcc
| 5
| January 2
| Golden State
| 
| Steve Nash (21)
| Channing Frye (10)
| Steve Nash (9)
| US Airways Center14,793
| 2–3
|- bgcolor=ffcccc
| 6
| January 4
| @ Dallas
| 
| Marcin Gortat (22)
| Channing Frye,Marcin Gortat (10)
| Steve Nash (12)
| American Airlines Center19,885
| 2–4
|- bgcolor=ccffcc
| 7
| January 6
| Portland
| 
| Jared Dudley (18)
| Robin Lopez (12)
| Steve Nash (9)
| US Airways Center16,235
| 3–4
|- bgcolor=ccffcc
| 8
| January 8
| Milwaukee
| 
| Marcin Gortat (18)
| Markieff Morris (10)
| Steve Nash (17)
| US Airways Center13,420
| 4–4
|- bgcolor=ffcccc
| 9
| January 10
| @ L. A. Lakers
| 
| Channing Frye (17)
| Marcin Gortat (12)
| Steve Nash (8)
| Staples Center18,997
| 4–5
|- bgcolor=ffcccc
| 10
| January 12
| Cleveland
| 
| Steve Nash (16)
| Marcin Gortat (10)
| Steve Nash (15)
| US Airways Center14,636
| 4–6
|- bgcolor=ffcccc
| 11
| January 13
| New Jersey
| 
| Marcin Gortat (20)
| Marcin Gortat (10)
| Ronnie Price (8)
| US Airways Center15,191
| 4–7
|- bgcolor=ffcccc
| 12
| January 15
| @ San Antonio
| 
| Marcin Gortat (24)
| Marcin Gortat (15)
| Steve Nash (10)
| AT&T Center18,581
| 4–8
|- bgcolor=ffcccc
| 13
| January 17
| @ Chicago
| 
| Steve Nash (25)
| Marcin Gortat (15)
| Steve Nash (9)
| United Center21,347
| 4–9
|- bgcolor=ccffcc
| 14
| January 18
| @ New York
| 
| Steve Nash (26)
| Marcin Gortat (12)
| Steve Nash (11)
| Madison Square Garden19,763
| 5–9
|- bgcolor=ccffcc
| 15
| January 20
| @ Boston
| 
| Marcin Gortat (24)
| Marcin Gortat (12)
| Steve Nash (9)
| TD Garden18,624
| 6–9
|- bgcolor=ffcccc
| 16
| January 23
| @ Dallas
| 
| Marcin Gortat,Grant Hill (19)
| Marcin Gortat (17)
| Steve Nash (12)
| American Airlines Center19,944
| 6–10
|- bgcolor=ffcccc
| 17
| January 24
| Toronto
| 
| Marcin Gortat (21)
| Marcin Gortat (12)
| Steve Nash (14)
| US Airways Center15,404
| 6–11
|- bgcolor=ffcccc
| 18
| January 27
| @ Portland
| 
| Grant Hill (12)
| Marcin Gortat (10)
| Steve Nash (7)
| Rose Garden20,664
| 6–12
|- bgcolor=ccffcc
| 19
| January 28
| Memphis
| 
| Steve Nash (21)
| Marcin Gortat (12)
| Steve Nash (6)
| US Airways Center14,903
| 7–12
|- bgcolor=ffcccc
| 20
| January 30
| Dallas
| 
| Marcin Gortat (17)
| Marcin Gortat (10)
| Sebastian Telfair (6)
| US Airways Center13,132
| 7–13

|- bgcolor=ccffcc
| 21
| February 1
| @ New Orleans
| 
| Steve Nash (30)
| Marcin Gortat (11)
| Steve Nash (10)
| New Orleans Arena13,598
| 8–13
|- bgcolor=ffcccc
| 22
| February 3
| @ Houston
| 
| Jared Dudley,Marcin Gortat (15)
| Marcin Gortat (12)
| Steve Nash (9)
| Toyota Center15,941
| 8–14
|- bgcolor=ccffcc
| 23
| February 4
| Charlotte
| 
| Michael Redd (17)
| Marcin Gortat (12)
| Steve Nash (10)
| US Airways Center14,928
| 9–14
|- bgcolor=ccffcc
| 24
| February 6
| @ Atlanta
| 
| Steve Nash (24)
| Channing Frye,Marcin Gortat (9)
| Steve Nash (11)
| Philips Arena11,823
| 10–14
|- bgcolor=cccffcc
| 25
| February 7
| @ Milwaukee
| 
| Marcin Gortat (21)
| Josh Childress (12)
| Steve Nash (11)
| Bradley Center13,203
| 11–14
|- bgcolor=ffcccc
| 26
| February 9
| Houston
| 
| Channing Frye (21)
| Channing Frye (10)
| Steve Nash (13)
| US Airways Center16,122
| 11–15
|- bgcolor=ccffcc
| 27
| February 11
| @ Sacramento
| 
| Jared Dudley (20)
| Jared Dudley (10)
| Steve Nash (15)
| Power Balance Pavilion16,964
| 12–15
|- bgcolor=ffcccc
| 28
| February 13
| @ Golden State
| 
| Marcin Gortat (25)
| Marcin Gortat (12)
| Steve Nash (14)
| Oracle Arena19,106
| 12–16
|- bgcolor=ffcccc
| 29
| February 14
| @ Denver
| 
| Markieff Morris (21)
| Marcin Gortat (14)
| Ronnie Price (6)
| Pepsi Center17,873
| 12–17
|- bgcolor=ffcccc
| 30
| February 15
| Atlanta
| 
| Steve Nash (22)
| Channing Frye (11)
| Steve Nash (16)
| US Airways Center15,392
| 12–18
|- bgcolor=ffcccc
| 31
| February 17
| @ L. A. Lakers
| 
| Marcin Gortat (21)
| Marcin Gortat (16)
| Steve Nash (17)
| Staples Center18,997
| 12–19
|- bgcolor=ccffcc
| 32
| February 19
| L. A. Lakers
| 
| Jared Dudley (25)
| Marcin Gortat (15)
| Steve Nash (14)
| US Airways Center18,023
| 13–19
|- bgcolor=ccffcc
| 33
| February 20
| Washington
| 
| Marcin Gortat (20)
| Channing Frye (11)
| Steve Nash (11)
| US Airways Center13,921
| 14–19
|- bgcolor=ffcccc
| 34
| February 22
| Golden State
| 
| Channing Frye (22)
| Marcin Gortat (15)
| Steve Nash (9)
| US Airways Center14,558
| 14–20
|- align="center"
|colspan="9" bgcolor="#bbcaff"|All-Star Break

|- bgcolor=ccffcc
| 35
| March 1
| Minnesota
| 
| Grant Hill (20)
| Steve Nash (8)
| Steve Nash (17)
| US Airways Center15,071
| 15–20
|- bgcolor=ccffcc
| 36
| March 2
| L. A. Clippers
| 
| Jared Dudley (22)
| Channing Frye,Marcin Gortat (14)
| Steve Nash (6)
| US Airways Center18,091
| 16–20
|- bgcolor=ccffcc
| 37
| March 4
| Sacramento
| 
| Steve Nash (19)
| Marcin Gortat (17)
| Steve Nash (7)
| US Airways Center15,026
| 17–20
|- bgcolor=ffcccc
| 38
| March 7
| @ Oklahoma City
| 
| Marcin Gortat (28)
| Jared Dudley,Marcin Gortat (11)
| Steve Nash (13)
| Chesapeake Energy Arena18,203
| 17–21
|- bgcolor=ccffcc
| 39
| March 8
| Dallas
| 
| Jared Dudley (18)
| Marcin Gortat (12)
| Steve Nash (11)
| US Airways Center15,498
| 18–21
|- bgcolor=ccffcc
| 40
| March 10
| Memphis
| 
| Jared Dudley (19)
| Marcin Gortat (9)
| Steve Nash (15)
| US Airways Center16,350
| 19–21
|- bgcolor=ffcccc
| 41
| March 12
| Minnesota
| 
| Jared Dudley (28)
| Jared Dudley (9)
| Steve Nash (10)
| US Airways Center14,568
| 19–22
|- bgcolor=ccffcc
| 42
| March 14
| Utah
| 
| Channing Frye (26)
| Channing Frye (9)
| Steve Nash (16)
| US Airways Center14,076
| 20–22
|- bgcolor=ccffcc
| 43
| March 15
| @ L. A. Clippers
| 
| Shannon Brown (21)
| Jared Dudley,Channing Frye,Marcin Gortat,Markieff Morris (6)
| Sebastian Telfair (8)
| Staples Center19,060
| 21–22
|- bgcolor=ccffcc
| 44
| March 16
| Detroit
| 
| Jared Dudley (23)
| Channing Frye (13)
| Steve Nash (17)
| US Airways Center17,148
| 22–22
|- bgcolor=ccffcc
| 45
| March 18
| Houston
| 
| Michael Redd (25)
| Marcin Gortat (10)
| Steve Nash (11)
| US Airways Center15,645
| 23–22
|- bgcolor=ffcccc
| 46
| March 20
| @ Miami
| 
| Grant Hill (19)
| Marcin Gortat (8)
| Steve Nash (10)
| American Airlines Arena20,212
| 23–23
|- bgcolor=ffcccc
| 47
| March 21
| @ Orlando
| 
| Jared Dudley (17)
| Marcin Gortat (9)
| Marcin Gortat,Sebastian Telfair (3)
| Amway Center18,930
| 23–24
|- bgcolor=ccffcc
| 48
| March 23
| @ Indiana
| 
| Marcin Gortat (23)
| Marcin Gortat (8)
| Steve Nash (17)
| Bankers Life Fieldhouse14,786
| 24–24
|- bgcolor=ccffcc
| 49
| March 25
| @ Cleveland
| 
| Marcin Gortat,Markieff Morris (22)
| Marcin Gortat (8)
| Steve Nash (13)
| Quicken Loans Arena17,307
| 25–24
|- bgcolor=ffcccc
| 50
| March 27
| San Antonio
| 
| Shannon Brown (32)
| Marcin Gortat (14)
| Steve Nash (8)
| US Airways Center16,573
| 25–25
|- bgcolor=ffcccc
| 51
| March 28
| @ L. A. Clippers
| 
| Marcin Gortat (23)
| Channing Frye,Marcin Gortat (7)
| Steve Nash (15)
| Staples Center19,060
| 25–26

|- bgcolor=ccffcc
| 52
| April 1
| New Orleans
| 
| Jared Dudley (21)
| Channing Frye (11)
| Steve Nash (14)
| US Airways Center15,753
| 26–26
|- bgcolor=ccffcc
| 53
| April 3
| @ Sacramento
| 
| Marcin Gortat (20)
| Marcin Gortat (10)
| Steve Nash (12)
| Power Balance Pavilion12,462
| 27–26
|- bgcolor=ccffcc
| 54
| April 4
| @ Utah
| 
| Michael Redd (19)
| Marcin Gortat (8)
| Steve Nash (9)
| EnergySolutions Arena19,911
| 28–26
|- bgcolor=ffcccc
| 55
| April 6
| @ Denver
| 
| Shannon Brown (18)
| Marcin Gortat (14)
| Steve Nash (11)
| Pepsi Center19,155
| 28–27
|- bgcolor=ccffcc
| 56
| April 7
| L. A. Lakers
| 
| Shannon Brown (24)
| Marcin Gortat (9)
| Steve Nash (11)
| US Airways Center18,237
| 29–27
|- bgcolor=ccffcc
| 57
| April 9
| @ Minnesota
| 
| Markieff Morris (21)
| Shannon Brown,Marcin Gortat (7)
| Sebastian Telfair (7)
| Target Center17,274
| 30–27
|- bgcolor=ffcccc
| 58
| April 11
| @ Memphis
| 
| Marcin Gortat (19)
| Markieff Morris (6)
| Steve Nash (10)
| FedExForum15,239
| 30–28
|- bgcolor=ccffcc
| 59
| April 13
| @ Houston
| 
| Marcin Gortat (20)
| Marcin Gortat (15)
| Steve Nash (10)
| Toyota Center18,223
| 31–28
|- bgcolor=ffcccc
| 60
| April 14
| @ San Antonio
| 
| Sebastian Telfair (21)
| Robin Lopez,Markieff Morris (9)
| Markieff Morris,Sebastian Telfair (4)
| AT&T Center18,581
| 31–29
|- bgcolor=ccffcc
| 61
| April 16
| Portland
| 
| Marcin Gortat (20)
| Marcin Gortat (10)
| Steve Nash (13)
| US Airways Center15,322
| 32–29
|- bgcolor=ffcccc
| 62
| April 18
| Oklahoma City
| 
| Jared Dudley (21)
| Marcin Gortat (12)
| Steve Nash (5)
| US Airways Center14,873
| 32–30
|- bgcolor=ccffcc
| 63
| April 19
| L. A. Clippers
| 
| Jared Dudley (18)
| Marcin Gortat (14)
| Steve Nash (6)
| US Airways Center14,644
| 33–30
|- bgcolor=ffcccc
| 64
| April 21
| Denver
| 
| Shannon Brown (28)
| Marcin Gortat (11)
| Steve Nash (13)
| US Airways Center15,877
| 33–31
|- bgcolor=ffcccc
| 65
| April 24
| @ Utah
| 
| Jared Dudley,Michael Redd (15)
| Marcin Gortat (12)
| Steve Nash (11)
| EnergySolutions Arena19,911
| 33–32
|- bgcolor=ffcccc
| 66
| April 25
| San Antonio
| 
| Shannon Brown (21)
| Marcin Gortat (10)
| Steve Nash (7)
| US Airways Center17,172
| 33–33

Player statistics

Season

|- align="center" bgcolor=""
|  || 59 || 19 || 23.7 || .420 || .362 || .808 || 2.7 || 1.2 || .7 || .3 || 11.0
|- align="center" bgcolor="#f0f0f0"
|  || 34 || 0 || 14.4 || .485 || .167 || .000 || 2.8 || 1.0 || .4 || .2 || 2.9
|- align="center" bgcolor=""
|  || 65 || 60 || 31.1 || .485 || .383 || .726 || 4.6 || 1.7 || .8 || .3 || 12.7
|- align="center" bgcolor="#f0f0f0"
|  || 64 || 59 || 26.1 || .416 || .346 || .890 || 5.9 || 1.4 || .7 || 1.1 || 10.5
|- align="center" bgcolor=""
|  || style="background:#FF8800;color:#423189;" | 66 || style="background:#FF8800;color:#423189;" | 66 || style="background:#FF8800;color:#423189;" | 32.0 || style="background:#FF8800;color:#423189;" | .555 || .000 || .649 || style="background:#FF8800;color:#423189;" | 10.0 || 0.9 || .7 || style="background:#FF8800;color:#423189;" | 1.5 || style="background:#FF8800;color:#423189;" | 15.4
|- align="center" bgcolor="#f0f0f0"
|  || 49 || 46 || 28.1 || .446 || .264 || .761 || 3.5 || 2.2 || .8 || .6 || 10.2
|- align="center" bgcolor=""
|  || 64 || 0 || 14.0 || .461 || .000 || .714 || 3.3 || 0.3 || .3 || .9 || 5.4
|- align="center" bgcolor="#f0f0f0"
|  || 63 || 7 || 19.5 || .399 || .347 || .717 || 4.4 || 1.0 || .7 || .7 || 7.4
|- align="center" bgcolor=""
|  || 62 || 62 || 31.6 || .532 || style="background:#FF8800;color:#423189;" | .390 || style="background:#FF8800;color:#423189;" | .894 || 3.0 || style="background:#FF8800;color:#423189;" | 10.7 || .6 || .1 || 12.5
|- align="center" bgcolor="#f0f0f0"
|  || 36 || 8 || 14.4 || .377 || .295 || .800 || 1.6 || 1.9 || style="background:#FF8800;color:#423189;" | .9 || .1 || 3.6
|- align="center" bgcolor=""
|  || 51 || 2 || 15.1 || .400 || .318 || .793 || 1.5 || 0.6 || .3 || .0 || 8.2
|- align="center" bgcolor="#f0f0f0"
|  || 60 || 1 || 14.9 || .412 || .314 || .791 || 1.5 || 2.3 || .7 || .2 || 6.1
|- align="center" bgcolor=""
|  || 35 || 0 || 14.4 || .411 || .100 || .768 || 2.6 || 0.9 || .2 || .1 || 6.4
|}

Awards, records and milestones

Awards
Former head coach John MacLeod gets put into the Phoenix Suns Ring of Honor on April 18, 2012 against the Oklahoma City Thunder.
Steve Nash was named the winner of the PBWA's Magic Johnson Award, which is an award given to the player that best combines excellence on the court with cooperation and dignity in dealing with the media and the public alike.

Week/Month

All-Star
Markieff Morris is represented in the 2012 Rising Stars Challenge.
Steve Nash gets his 8th representation as an All-Star player, with this being his 6th and final representation coming from the Phoenix Suns.

Records
Josh Childress broke the record for the most number of minutes played in one season without making a free throw with 491 minutes played this season.

Team Records
Steve Nash surpassed Dick Van Arsdale as the third-most played Suns player ever.
Steve Nash made his 1,000th 3 pointer with the Phoenix Suns on December 31, 2011.
Steve Nash becomes the #1 assist leader of all Phoenix Suns players on February 1, 2012, surpassing the mark previously set by Kevin Johnson.

Milestones
Steve Nash gets his 16,000th career point on January 12, 2012.
Steve Nash passes Oscar Robertson as the third-most player with 15+ assist games on March 10, 2012. He's currently behind John Stockton and Magic Johnson.
Grant Hill gets his 17,000th career point on March 20, 2012.
Steve Nash passes Oscar Robertson as the fifth-most NBA assists leader of all time on April 21, 2012.
Marcin Gortat averages his first ever double-double throughout an entire season.

Team Milestones
The Suns committed the franchise's lowest turnover count in a game with 3 turnovers against the Los Angeles Lakers on April 7, 2012.

Injuries/Missed games
12/20/11: Marcin Gortat: Non-displaced right thumb fracture; out until December 25
12/30/11: Michael Redd: Left knee; placed on injured list until January 12
01/13/12: Grant Hill: Strained right quadriceps; did not play
01/13/12: Steve Nash: Bruised right quadriceps; did not play
01/25/12: Robin Lopez: League suspension (making contact with a referee): did not play
01/30/12: Steve Nash: Bruised left thigh; did not play
02/04/12: Jared Dudley: Bruised thigh; did not play
02/14/12: Grant Hill: Rest; did not play
02/14/12: Steve Nash: Rest; did not play
03/15/12: Grant Hill: Rest; did not play
03/15/12: Steve Nash: Rest; did not play
03/27/12: Grant Hill: Right knee inflammation; did not play
03/28/12: Grant Hill: Right knee inflammation; did not play
03/28/12: Markieff Morris: Flu; did not play
03/30/12: Grant Hill: Surgery to repair torn meniscus in right knee; out until April 13
04/16/12: Grant Hill: Right knee; did not play
04/18/12: Grant Hill: Right knee; did not play
04/19/12: Grant Hill: Right knee, did not play
04/21/12: Grant Hill: Right knee, did not play
04/24/12: Channing Frye: Subluxed right shoulder; did not play
04/25/12: Channing Frye: Subluxed right shoulder; did not play
04/25/12: Grant Hill: Right knee; did not play

Transactions

Trades

Free agents

Additions

Subtractions

See also
 2011–12 NBA season

References

Phoenix Suns seasons
Phoenix Suns